Grant Airport  is a privately owned, public use airport located two nautical miles (4 km) northeast of the central business district of Grant, a city in Newaygo County, Michigan, United States. The airport is uncontrolled, and is used for general aviation purposes.

Facilities and aircraft 
Grant Airport covers an area of 80 acres (32 ha) at an elevation of 815 feet (248 m) above mean sea level. It has one runway designated 9/27 with a turf surface measuring 2,517 by 120 feet (767 x 37 m).

For the 12-month period ending December 31, 2010, the airport had 600 general aviation aircraft operations, an average of 50 per month. At that time there were 12 aircraft based at this airport, all single-engine.

References

External links
 Aerial image as of April 1999 from USGS The National Map

Defunct airports in Michigan
Airports in Michigan
Transportation in Newaygo County, Michigan
Buildings and structures in Newaygo County, Michigan